Gorgeous George is the third solo studio album by Scottish musician Edwyn Collins. The album was recorded at New River in London, with Collins acting as the producer. It was released on 1 July 1994 and features guest musician Paul Cook of the original Sex Pistols.

Track listing
 "The Campaign for Real Rock" – 6:35
 "A Girl Like You" – 3:58
 "Low Expectations" – 3:58
 "Out of This World" – 5:37
 "If You Could Love Me" – 5:30
 "North of Heaven" – 3:39
 "Gorgeous George" – 4:08
 "It's Right in Front of You" – 6:26
 "Make Me Feel Again" – 4:22
 "I've Got It Bad" – 4:40
 "Subsidence" – 5:44
 "Moron" – 3:26

Personnel
Personnel per booklet.

Main musicians
 Edwyn Collins – vocals, guitar, keyboards; bass and drums on track 10
 Paul Cook – drums, percussion
 Clare Kenny – bass guitar

Additional musicians
 Vic Godard – backing vocals on tracks 1–2
 Sean Read – backing vocals on tracks 1–2, 4, 6–8 and 11
 Dennis Bovell – bass on track 5
 Martin Drover – flugelhorn on track 5
 Patrick Arbuthnot – pedal steel on track 6
 Sebastian Lewsley – ARP synthesizer on tracks 8 and 11

Production
 Edwyn Collins – producer, arranger, engineer
 Sebastian Lewsley – engineer
 Duncan Cowell – mastering
 Gavin Evans – photography
 Rob Crane – sleeve art

References

1994 albums
Edwyn Collins albums
Jangle pop albums
Setanta Records albums
Albums produced by Edwyn Collins